School Lane station is SEPTA Route 101 trolley station in Drexel Hill, Pennsylvania. It is located on School Lane west of Edmonds Avenue. The station is next to Grace Lutheran Church on the northwest corner of the aforementioned intersection.

Trolleys arriving at this station travel between 69th Street Terminal in Upper Darby, Pennsylvania, and Orange Street in Media, Pennsylvania. The station features a P&W-era shed with a roof in which passengers can wait during inclement weather. The shed is made of stucco similar to that of the nearby Aronimink stop. An actual school can be found one block east of this intersection. No parking is available at this stop, as it is located in a residential area.

Station layout

External links

July 3, 1999 Fantrip image (World-NYC Subway.org)
 Station from School Lane from Google Maps Street View

SEPTA Media–Sharon Hill Line stations